Antiguraleus abbreviatus is an extinct species of sea snail, a marine gastropod mollusk in the family Mangeliidae.

Description

Distribution
This extinct species was found in Tertiary strata in Australia.

References

 Powell, Arthur William Baden. "The Australian Tertiary Mollusca of the Family Turridae." Records of the Auckland Institute and Museum 3.1 (1944): 3-68.

abbreviatus
Gastropods described in 1944
Gastropods of Australia